The 2022 United States House of Representatives elections in Iowa were held on November 8, 2022, to elect the four U.S. representatives from the State of Iowa, one from each of the state's four congressional districts. The elections coincided with the other elections to the House of Representatives, elections to the United States Senate and various state and local elections. These was the first congressional elections held in Iowa after the 2020 redistricting cycle.

Republicans won all 4 House seats, making this the first time since 1994 that Democrats have been completely shut out of Iowa's House delegation.

Background
In the 2020 elections, Republicans flipped the 1st and 2nd congressional districts while holding the 4th, while Democrats only managed to hold onto the 3rd. Iowa is considered to be an important state in the 2022 midterm elections, as Republicans only needed a net gain of 5 seats to flip the House of Representatives, and the 3rd district had one of the closest House elections won by a Democrat in 2020. At an event in 2021, United States Senator Ted Cruz (R-TX), claimed that the "road to the majority...comes through Iowa." However, Democrats remained optimistic, with former U.S. Representative Abby Finkenauer saying she "couldn't be more excited" about the roster of Iowa Democrats running for Congress in 2022.

District 1

After redistricting, most of the old 2nd district became the 1st district. The reconfigured 1st covers southeastern Iowa, and includes Davenport, Iowa City, Muscatine, Clinton, Burlington,  Fort Madison, Oskaloosa, Bettendorf, Newton and Pella the 1st district was based in northeastern Iowa, and included the cities of Dubuque, Cedar Rapids and Waterloo. First-term Republican Mariannette Miller-Meeks sought reelection in this district. Miller-Meeks flipped the 2nd district with 49.9% of the vote in 2020, defeating Democratic nominee Rita Hart by just 6 votes out of more than 394,000 cast, a margin of 0.002%

Republican primary

Candidates

Nominee 
Mariannette Miller-Meeks, incumbent U.S. Representative

Withdrawn
Kyle Kuehl, business owner

Endorsements

Primary results

Democratic primary

Candidates

Nominee
Christina Bohannan, state representative

Withdrawn
Joseph Kerner (running for state house)

Declined
Rita Hart, former state senator, nominee for Lieutenant Governor of Iowa in 2018, and nominee for this district in 2020

Endorsements

Primary results

General election

Predictions

Polling
Graphical summary

Generic Republican vs. generic Democrat

Results

District 2

After redistricting, most of the old 1st district became the 2nd district. The reconfigured 2nd is located in northeastern Iowa and includes Dubuque, Cedar Rapids, Waterloo and Mason City. Freshman Republican Ashley Hinson, who flipped the district with 51.2% of the vote in 2020, sought reelection in the 2nd.

Republican primary

Candidates

Nominee
Ashley Hinson, incumbent U.S. Representative

Endorsements

Primary results

Democratic primary

Candidates

Nominee
Liz Mathis, state senator

Declined
Abby Finkenauer, former U.S. Representative (running for the U.S. Senate)

Endorsements

Primary results

General election

Predictions

Polling
Graphical summary

Generic Republican vs. generic Democrat

Results

District 3

Before redistricting, the 3rd district encompassed southwestern Iowa, stretching from Des Moines to the state's borders with Nebraska and Missouri. The new 3rd is still anchored in Des Moines, but now covers south-central Iowa. The incumbent is Democrat Cindy Axne, who was re-elected with 48.9% of the vote in 2020.

During the campaign, a research firm contracted by the Democratic Congressional Campaign Committee inappropriately obtained the military records of then-candidate Zach Nunn.

Democratic primary

Candidates

Nominee
Cindy Axne, incumbent U.S. Representative

Endorsements

Primary results

Republican primary

Candidates

Nominee
Zach Nunn, state senator

Eliminated in primary
Nicole Hasso, financial planner
Gary Leffler, construction consultant

Withdrawn
Mary Ann Hanusa, former state representative (running for State Auditor)

Endorsements

Debates and forums

Polling

Primary results

General election

Predictions

Polling
Aggregate polls

Graphical summary

Generic Democrat vs. generic Republican

Results

District 4

Before redistricting, the 4th district was based in northwestern Iowa, including Sioux City, Ames, Mason City, Fort Dodge, Boone and Carroll. The redrawn 4th also covers much of southwestern Iowa, including Council Bluffs. The incumbent is Republican Randy Feenstra, who was elected with 62.0% of the vote in 2020.

Republican primary

Candidates

Nominee
Randy Feenstra, incumbent U.S. Representative

Endorsements

Primary results

Democratic primary

Candidates

Nominee
Ryan Melton, Nationwide insurance supervisor

Declined
J. D. Scholten, former professional baseball player and nominee for this district in 2018 and 2020 (running for state house)

Primary results

Other parties and independents

Candidates 
Bryan Jack Holder, photographer and perennial candidate (Liberty)

Independents

Candidates

General election

Predictions

Polling

Generic Republican vs. generic Democrat

Results

See also 
 2022 Iowa elections

Notes

Partisan clients

References

External links
  (State affiliate of the U.S. League of Women Voters)
 

Official campaign websites for 1st district candidates
 Christina Bohannan (D) for Congress
 Mariannette Miller-Meeks (R) for Congress

Official campaign websites for 2nd district candidates
 Ashley Hinson (R) for Congress
 Liz Mathis (D) for Congress

Official campaign websites for 3rd district candidates
 Cindy Axne (D) for Congress
 Zach Nunn (R) for Congress

Official campaign websites for 4th district candidates
 Randy Feenstra (R) for Congress
 Ryan Melton (D) for Congress

2022
Iowa
United States House of Representatives